Sagamore Stévenin (born 9 May 1974, in Paris) is a French actor, sometimes also listed Thomas Stévenin in film credits.

Personal life 
Sagamore's father is the actor Jean-François Stévenin. Also in the acting profession are his brother Robinson Stévenin, Pierre Stévenin and his sister Salomé Stévenin.

Career 
He began his career in the early 1980s as a child actor. From then until 2006, he has been in around 25 French films and TV movies, becoming internationally known in 1999 as the main male role in the film Romance directed by Catherine Breillat.  This film ignited controversy due to its sexual themes and sparked public discussion about the difference between erotic art and pornography.

His first English-speaking role was as Étienne Balsan in the 2008 television film Coco Chanel starring Shirley MacLaine.

From February to May 2006, Sagamore acted in Paris in a French stage rendition of A Clockwork Orange.

Filmography

References

External links
 Sagamore Stevenin @ ECI Global Talent Management
 

1974 births
Living people
Male actors from Paris
French male film actors
French male television actors